The 1936 Masters Tournament was the third Masters Tournament, held April 3–6 at Augusta National Golf Club in Augusta, Georgia.

Horton Smith won his second Masters, one stroke ahead of runner-up Harry Cooper, with defending champion Gene Sarazen in third. Still officially named the "Augusta National Invitation Tournament," the purse was $5,000 with a winner's share of $1,500.

Due to heavy rains, the first round of play was postponed until Friday. Sunday's play was also postponed and the third and fourth rounds were played on Monday.

Cooper led after each of the first three rounds in an attempt to become the first wire-to-wire winner at the Masters; that occurred at the 1941 edition, won by Craig Wood. After three rounds under par, Cooper shot 76 (+4) in the final round on Monday afternoon, with his bogey on the 17th hole proving decisive.

Field
1. U.S. Open champions
Tommy Armour (3,10), Billy Burke, Johnny Farrell, Johnny Goodman (9,a), Walter Hagen (3,5,7,8), Bobby Jones (2,3,4), Fred McLeod, Sam Parks Jr. (5,7,8), Gene Sarazen (5,7,8), George Sargent

2. U.S. Amateur champions
Lawson Little (4,7,9), Jess Sweetser (4,a)

3. British Open champions
Jock Hutchison, Denny Shute (7,8)

4. British Amateur champions

5. Members of the U.S. 1935 Ryder Cup team
Ky Laffoon (8), Henry Picard (7,8), Johnny Revolta (7,10), Paul Runyan (7,8), Horton Smith (7,8), Craig Wood (7,8)

Olin Dutra (2,7,8), did not play

6. Members of the U.S. 1936 Walker Cup team
Team not selected in time for inclusion.

7. Top 24 players and ties from the 1935 Masters Tournament
Bobby Cruickshank (8), Johnny Dawson (a), Leo Diegel, Ed Dudley (8), Al Espinosa (8), Vic Ghezzi (8), Jimmy Hines, Ray Mangrum (8), Jug McSpaden, Byron Nelson, Joe Turnesa, Charlie Yates (a)

Clarence Clark and Leo Diegel did not play.

8. Top 30 players and ties from the 1935 U.S. Open
Herman Barron, Harry Cooper, Vincent Eldred, Bill Kaiser, Butch Krueger, Gene Kunes, Ted Luther, Dick Metz, Jimmy Thomson, Ted Turner, Frank Walsh, Al Watrous (10)

Mortie Dutra, Willie Hunter (4) and Macdonald Smith did not play.

9. 1935 U.S. Amateur quarter-finalists
Fred Haas (a), Jack Munger (a)

Walter Emery (a), Chuck Kocsis (a), Joe Lynch (a) and George Voigt (a) did not play.

10. 1935 PGA Championship quarter-finalists
Al Zimmerman did not play.

11. Two players, not already qualified, with the best scoring average in the winter part of the 1936 PGA Tour
Wiffy Cox, Orville White

12. Foreign invitations
Chin Sei-Sui, Jules Huot, Joe Kirkwood Sr., Robert Sweeny Jr. (a), Toichira Toda

Additional invitations
Albert Campbell (a), Bobby Riegel (a)

Round summaries

First round
Friday, April 3, 1936
 
Rain on Thursday delayed the first round a day.

Source:

Second round
Saturday, April 4, 1936 

Source:

Third round
Monday, April 6, 1936   (morning)

Rain on Sunday postponed the final two rounds to Monday.

Final round
Monday, April 6, 1936   (afternoon)

Final leaderboard

Sources:

Scorecard 

Cumulative tournament scores, relative to par
Source:

References

External links
Masters.com – past winners and results
Augusta.com – 1936 Masters leaderboard

1936
1936 in golf
1936 in American sports
1936 in sports in Georgia (U.S. state)
April 1936 sports events